The Unbearable Weight of Massive Talent is a 2022 American action comedy film directed by Tom Gormican, who co-wrote the screenplay with Kevin Etten. It stars Nicolas Cage as a fictionalized version of himself, along with a supporting cast including Pedro Pascal, Sharon Horgan, Ike Barinholtz, Alessandra Mastronardi, Jacob Scipio, Neil Patrick Harris and Tiffany Haddish. Filming began in Croatia on October 5, 2020.

The film premiered at South by Southwest on March 12, 2022, and was released in the United States on April 22, 2022, by Lionsgate. It received generally positive reviews from critics, with praise for the performances and chemistry of Cage and Pascal, but performed poorly at the box office, grossing only $29.1 million against its $30 million budget.

Plot
Hollywood actor Nicolas "Nick" Cage is struggling with his career after being passed over for several major film roles and is constantly pestered and tormented by "Nicky", who appears to him as his younger (and more successful) self. His relationship with his ex-wife Olivia and daughter Addy is also marred by years of emotional neglect. Losing a key film role and following an embarrassing event at Addy's birthday party, Nick plans to retire from acting. He decides to accept a vague offer of $1 million from his agent Richard Fink that involves going to Majorca to meet billionaire playboy Javi Gutierrez and to be the guest of honor at his birthday.

Upon meeting Javi, Nick is initially annoyed by his neediness and insistence that they create an improvisational movie based on a script he wrote, but is soon inspired by Javi's determination, and the two of them quickly bond over their surprisingly shared love of films such as The Cabinet of Dr. Caligari and Paddington 2 (the latter of which Nick watches for the first time with Javi). Soon after, Nick is confronted by CIA agents Vivian and Martin. They suspect that Javi, who they claim made his fortune through arms dealing, is behind the kidnapping of Maria, the daughter of a Catalan anti-crime politician, with the hope that he will drop out of an upcoming election. Nick insists that his acting instincts would've detected if Javi was a criminal, but he eventually decides to help the CIA with the mission.

After successfully rigging the cameras in Javi's compound, Nick attends a party where he announces his collaboration with Javi on a new movie, as an excuse to stay on the compound long enough to find Maria. After a misadventure involving LSD, Nick and Javi decide that their movie should be about their relationship. Nick later discovers that Javi keeps a shrine room dedicated to all of his movies, including a wax figure of his character Castor Troy from the film Face/Off, complete with identical golden pistols. Vivian suggests that Nick includes a kidnapping in their script, to get Javi's reaction to it.

Nick explains his new idea to Javi, who believes that Nick is distracted by his family issues. Vivian tells Nick to flee, or possibly kill Javi, as Javi has discovered their plot. But Javi reveals he's brought Nick's family to his villa. Nick tries to make amends with them, but they reject his appeal and accuse him of prioritizing his film career over his family. Javi privately goes to meet with his cousin Lucas, who is revealed to be the true arms dealer and the one who kidnapped Maria. Lucas warns him that Nick is working with the CIA and pressures him to kill Nick, or else Lucas will kill Javi.

Nick and Javi face off, but neither can bring themselves to kill the other. Lucas sends his men after both of them, and they race back to the house to discover that Addy has been kidnapped. Nick takes Javi, Olivia and Javi's assistant Gabriela to the CIA safe house, only for the house to have been compromised; Martin has been killed, while Vivian sacrifices herself to kill Lucas's men before they can ambush the group. With Javi's help, Nick and Olivia pose as a reclusive criminal couple to get close to Lucas. He figures out their plan, but they still manage to escape with Addy and Maria.

Nick, Addy, Olivia and Maria race to the American embassy while Javi and Gabriela stay behind to delay Lucas's pursuit. Upon arrival, Lucas holds Nick at gunpoint, but Addy tosses him a knife which Nick uses to kill himtransitioning into the movie that Nick and Javi completed, presumably based on their adventure. Nick is applauded for his new film and congratulates Javi before going home with his family to watch Paddington 2, now with a better relationship.

Cast

 Nicolas Cage as a fictionalized version of himself.
 Cage also portrays Nicky Cage (credited by Cage's birth name Nicolas Kim Coppola), a figment of Cage's imagination, seen as a younger version of himself. The character is based on the actor's infamous appearance on the talk show Wogan while promoting Wild at Heart.
 Pedro Pascal as Javi Gutierrez, a billionaire and Cage super-fan who pays Cage $1 million to appear at his birthday party.
 Sharon Horgan as Olivia Henson, Cage's ex-wife.
 Lily Mo Sheen as Addy Cage, Cage's daughter.
 Tiffany Haddish as Vivian Etten, a CIA agent and Martin's partner.
 Ike Barinholtz as Martin Etten, a CIA agent and Vivian's partner.
 Alessandra Mastronardi as Gabriela Lucchesi, Javi's assistant
 Paco León as Lucas Gutierrez, Javi's cousin.
 Jacob Scipio as Carlos, one of Lucas's men.
 Neil Patrick Harris as Richard Fink, Cage's agent.
 Katrin Vankova as Maria, the kidnapping victim
 David Gordon Green as himself, a film director.
 Demi Moore as "Olivia Cage", Cage's in-movie fictional ex-wife.
 Anna MacDonald as "Addy Cage", Cage's in-movie fictional daughter.
 Joanna Bobin as Cheryl, Cage's therapist.

Production
Cage plays a fictionalised version of himself who he said bore little resemblance to his real offscreen personality. He originally turned down the role "three or four times" but changed his mind after writer-director Tom Gormican wrote him a personal letter. On November 15, 2019, Lionsgate acquired the production rights. In August 2020, Pedro Pascal entered negotiations to star. In September 2020, Sharon Horgan and Tiffany Haddish joined the cast, and Lily Sheen was added in October. In November 2020, Neil Patrick Harris joined the cast.

Principal photography began on October 5, 2020, and wrapped on November 24, 2020. Most of the movie was shot in Hungary, with some areas around the city of Dubrovnik. Mark Isham composed the music.

Release
In the United States, the film was theatrically released on April 22, 2022. In New Zealand, it was released on April 17. It was originally set to be released on March 19, 2021. It premiered at the South by Southwest film festival on March 12, 2022.

The film was released for VOD on June 7, 2022, followed by a Blu-ray, DVD and 4K UHD release on June 21, 2022.

The film was released to Starz on October 21, 2022, 6 months after its theatrical release.

Reception

Box office
The Unbearable Weight of Massive Talent grossed $20.3 million in the United States and Canada, and $8.8 million in other territories, for a worldwide total of $29.1 million.

In United States and Canada, it was released alongside The Bad Guys and The Northman, and was projected to gross $5–10 million from 3,036 theaters in its opening weekend. It made $2.9 million on its first day, including $835,000 from Thursday night previews. It went on to debut to $7.1 million, finishing fifth at the box office. Deadline Hollywood noted that The Unbearable Weight of Massive Talent and The Northman were targeting the same demographic, which impacted their debuts. Deadline also mentioned the film's low awareness level at the time of its release and Cage's absence on social media as reasons it did not perform better. Men made up 59% of the audience during its opening, with those in the age range of 18–34 comprising 57% of ticket sales. The film made $3.9 million in its second weekend, finishing sixth, $1.6 million in its third, finishing eighth, and $1.1 million in its fourth, finishing tenth. It dropped out of the box office top ten in its fifth weekend with $754,976.

Critical response
  Audiences polled by CinemaScore gave the film an average grade of "B+" on an A+ to F scale, while those at PostTrak gave it an 82% positive score, with 66% saying they would definitely recommend it.

References

External links
 
 

2022 films
2022 action comedy films
2022 black comedy films
2022 crime films
2020s crime comedy films
American action comedy films
American black comedy films
American crime comedy films
Cultural depictions of actors
2020s English-language films
2020s Spanish-language films
Spanish-language American films
Films about actors
Films about the Central Intelligence Agency
Films about filmmaking
Films about kidnapping
Films about Mexican drug cartels
Films impacted by the COVID-19 pandemic
Films produced by Nicolas Cage
Films scored by Mark Isham
Films set in Los Angeles
Films set in Mallorca
Films shot in Croatia
Lionsgate films
Self-reflexive films
2020s American films